Tennis at the 2020 Summer Olympics in Tokyo was held between 24 July and 1 August 2021 at the Ariake Tennis Park.

The tournament featured 191 players in five events: singles and doubles for both men and women and mixed doubles. The hard-court Deco Turf surface at the 2020 Tokyo Olympic Games was chosen by the Tokyo Organizing Committee. This marked the fifth time that this type of surface was utilized for the Olympic Games.

The format at the 2020 Tokyo Olympic Games was a single-elimination tournament with men's and women's singles draws consisting of 64 players. There were six rounds of competition in singles, five rounds in doubles (draw size of 32), and four rounds in mixed doubles (draw size of 16). Players and teams reaching the semifinals were assured of competing for a medal with the two losing semifinalists competing for the bronze medal. All singles matches were best of three sets with a standard tiebreak (first to seven points) in every set, including the final set. In all doubles competition, a match tiebreak (first to ten points) was played instead of a third set.

Qualification

To be eligible, a player must meet certain requirements related to play on Davis Cup or Billie Jean King Cup teams. Qualification for the singles competitions is based primarily on the world rankings of 14 June 2021, with 56 players entering each of the men's and women's events (limited to four per National Olympic Committee (NOC)). Six of the remaining eight slots are to be allocated by continent for NOCs with no other qualifiers. The final two spots are reserved, one for the host nation and one for a previous Olympic gold medalist or Grand Slam champion. In the men's and women's doubles competitions, 32 teams are scheduled to compete. Up to 10 places are reserved for players in the top 10 of the doubles ranking, who could select any player from their NOC ranked in the top 300 in either singles or doubles. The remaining slots are allocated by combined rankings, with preference given to singles players once the total player quota is met. One team per gender is to be reserved for the host nation if none has already become eligible otherwise. No quota spots are available for mixed doubles; instead, all teams will consist of players already entered in the singles or doubles. The top 15 combined ranking teams and the host nation are eligible.

Andy Murray of Great Britain was the two-time defending champion in men's singles, but withdrew before his first-round match due to a quadriceps strain. Monica Puig of Puerto Rico was the defending champion in women's singles, but did not return to defend her title in order to recover from surgery.

Schedule

Participating nations 

 

 
 
 
 
 
 
 
 
 
 
 
 
 
 
 
 
 
 
 
 
*
 
 
 
 
 
 
 
 
 
 
 
 
 
 
 
 
 
 
 
 
 
 

*Host nation indicated in bold.

Medal summary
In men's singles, Alexander Zverev of Germany won the gold medal by defeating Karen Khachanov of the Russian Olympic Committee, 6–3, 6–1. In men's doubles, Nikola Mektić and Mate Pavić of Croatia defeated compatriots Marin Čilić and Ivan Dodig 6–4, 3–6, 10–6.

In women's singles, Belinda Bencic of Switzerland won the gold medal over Markéta Vondroušová of the Czech Republic 7–5, 2–6, 6–3. In women's doubles, Barbora Krejčíková and Kateřina Siniaková of the Czech Republic defeated Bencic and Viktorija Golubic of Switzerland 7–5, 6–1.

In mixed doubles, Andrey Rublev and Anastasia Pavlyuchenkova of the Russian Olympic Committee defeated compatriots Elena Vesnina and Aslan Karatsev, 6–3, 6–7 (5), [13–11].

Medal events

See also
Tennis at the 2018 Asian Games
Tennis at the 2018 Summer Youth Olympics
Tennis at the 2019 African Games
Tennis at the 2019 Pan American Games
Wheelchair tennis at the 2020 Summer Paralympics

References

External links
 Results book 

 
2020
2020 Summer Olympics events
Olympics
Tennis tournaments in Japan
2021 in Japanese tennis